Tetraethylenepentamine (TEPA) is an organic compound and is in the class of chemicals known as ethyleneamines. It is a slightly viscous liquid and is not colorless but, like many amines, has a yellow color. It is soluble in most polar solvents. Diethylenetriamine (DETA), triethylenetetramine (TETA), piperazine, and aminoethylpiperazine are also usually present in commercial available TEPA.

Uses
The reactivity and uses of TEPA are similar to those for the related ethylene amines ethylenediamine and diethylenetriamine and triethylenetetramine.  It is primarily used as a curing agent or hardener in epoxy chemistry. This can be on its own or reacted with tall oil fatty acid (TOFA) and its dimer to  make an amidoamine. This amidoamine is then used as the curing agent for epoxy resin systems. TEPA is a pentadentate ligand in coordination chemistry.

References

Ethyleneamines
Secondary amines